Thomas "Jumbo" Schreiner (born 24 November 1967, in Munich) is a German actor and presenter.

Filmography 
 Nitro (2006) as The Bonehead
  (2006) - Bodyguard B
 Tramitz & Friends (2005) - Guard
 Die Anonymen Mobiholiker (short, 2005)
  (2004) - Tyson
 Traumschiff Surprise – Periode 1 (2004) - Bad knight
 Bully & Rick (2004) as Jumbo
 Bomb 'n Venice (2001, as Thomas Schreiner) - Igor's bodyguard 
 Bullyparade (2000–2001) - The Rocker
  (2000) - Corvette Branko (uncredited)
 Tatort (2000, as Thomas Schreiner) - Latino

External links

 
 http://www.jumbo-schreiner.de/

1967 births
Living people
Male actors from Munich
German male television actors
German male film actors